The following are the association football events of the year 2012 throughout the world.

Events

Men

Senior 
 Men's Football Tournament at the 2012 Summer Olympics in London, 
  
  
  
 4th 
  
  
  
 4th 
 March 8 – March 19: 2012 AFC Challenge Cup in 
  
  
  
 4th 
 June 1 – June 3: 2012 Baltic Cup in 
  
  
  
 4th 
 June 3 – June 11: 2012 OFC Nations Cup in 
  
  
  
 4th 
  
  
   and 
22 June – 6 July 2012: 2012 Arab Nations Cup in 
  
  
  
 4th 
 September 25 – September 29: 2012 Philippine Peace Cup in the 
  
  
  
 4th 
 September 22 – October 2: 2012 Nehru Cup in 
  
   
  
 4th 
November 24 – December 8: 2012 CECAFA Cup in 
  
  
  
 4th 
  
  
December 7 – December 16: 2012 Caribbean Cup in 
  
  
  
 4th 
December 8 – December 20: 2012 West Asian Football Federation Championship in 
  
  
  
 4th

Youth 
3 July – 15 July: 2012 UEFA European Under-19 Football Championship in 
  
  
22 September – 6 October: 2012 AFC U-16 Championship in 
  
  
3 November – 17 November: 2012 AFC U-19 Championship in the

Women
 Women's Tournament at the 2012 Summer Olympics in London, 
  
  
  
 4th: 
 20 January – 5 February: 2012 South American Under-20 Women's Football Championship in 
  
  
  
 4th: 
 29 February – 7 March: 2012 Algarve Cup in 
  
  
  
 4th: 
 August 18 – September 9 — 2012 FIFA U-20 Women's World Cup in 
  
  
  
 4th: 
 September 22 – October 13 — 2012 FIFA U-17 Women's World Cup in 
  
  
  
 4th:

News 
 In 2012, Major League Soccer in the United States and Canada added its 19th team, confirmed in 2010 as the Montreal Impact.
 CONCACAF changes the format of its club continental cup in the 2012–13 CONCACAF Champions League, taking out the preliminary round and putting the 24 teams in 8 groups of 3 teams each.
 January 30 – Women's Professional Soccer in the U.S. announced that it would cancel its 2012 season, with hopes of returning in 2013. The cancellation was the latest fallout from conflict with team owner Dan Borislow that consumed much of the 2011 season and extended into the offseason.
 May 18 – Women's Professional Soccer folded.
 November 21 – The United States Soccer Federation (U.S. Soccer) announced that it would launch a new women's professional league in 2013. The league, as yet unnamed, will have eight teams at launch, four of which have ties to former WPS teams. U.S. Soccer, the Canadian Soccer Association, and the Mexican Football Federation will pay the league salaries for many of their respective national team players, and U.S. Soccer will also house the league offices.
 December 9 – After scoring twice in a La Liga match against Real Betis, Lionel Messi establishes the new world record for most goals scored in a single calendar year, with 91 – surpassing Gerd Müller's 85 in 1972.
 December 15 – U.S. Soccer officially announces that its top-level women's league to be launched in 2013 will be known as the National Women's Soccer League.

2011–12 Egyptian Premier League 
The 2011–2012 season, the league increased from 16 to 19 teams due to no relegation in the 2010–11 season as a result of the 2011 Egyptian revolution.  Three teams were promoted from the second division.

Following the Port Said Stadium disaster on 1 February 2012, the season was suspended. At that time, teams had played between 14 and 17 games out of 30. Haras El-Hodood was in first place with a 12–1–1 record.  This result was considered a significant surprise by Al Ahram. On 10 March 2012, a decision was reached to cancel the remainder of the season.

Fixed dates for national team matches 
Scheduled international matches per their International Match Calendar. Also known as FIFA International Day/Date(s).
29 February
22 August
8-12 September
13-17 October
14 November

Continental champions

Men

Women

Domestic Champions

AFC nations

UEFA nations

CAF nations

CONCACAF nations

CONMEBOL nations

OFC nations

Deaths

January

 January 1 - Gary Ablett, English footballer (born 1965)
 January 2 - Ioan Drăgan, Romanian footballer (born 1965)
 January 2 - Paulo Rodrigues da Silva, Brazilian footballer (born 1986)
 January 3 - Juan Escudero, Spanish footballer (born 1920)
 January 3 - Willi Entenmann, German footballer (born 1943)
 January 6 - Harry Fearnley, English footballer (born 1923)
 January 8 - Graham Rathbone, Welsh footballer (born 1942)
 January 9 - Bill Dickie, Scottish footballer administrator (born 1929)
 January 10 - Cliff Portwood, English footballer (born 1937)
 January 10 – Alfred Pyka, German international footballer (born 1934)
 January 13 - Lefter Küçükandonyadis, Turkish Olympic footballer (born 1925)
 January 14 - Zelemkhan Zangiyev, Russian footballer (born 1974)
 January 16 - Juan Carlos, Spanish footballer (born 1945)
 January 20 - Walter Whitehurst, English footballer (born 1934)
 January 21 - Ernie Gregory, English footballer (born 1921)
 January 21 - Jeffrey Ntuka, South African footballer (born 1985)
 January 24 - Pierre Sinibaldi, French footballer (born 1924)
 January 27 - Juan Sarrachini, Argentine footballer (born 1946)
 January 31 - Stefano Angeleri, Italian footballer (born 1926)
 January 31 - Sid Ottewell, English footballer (born 1919)

February
 February 1 – Ladislav Kuna, Slovak football player and manager (born 1947).
 February 4 - Pongphan Wongsuwan, Thai football manager (born 1951)
 February 6 - Juan Vicente Lezcano, Paraguayan football defender (born 1937)
 February 8 - Enrique Moreno Bellver, Spanish footballer (born 1963)
 February 12 - Malcolm Devitt, English footballer (born 1937)
 February 13 - Eamonn Deacy, Irish footballer (born 1958)
 February 13 - Sansón, Spanish footballer (born 1924)
 February 14 - Tom McAnearney, Scottish footballer (born 1933)
 February 14 - Alfredo Vega, Paraguayan footballer (born 1935)
 February 16 - John Ritchie, English footballer (born 1944)
 February 17 - Jordan da Costa, Brazilian footballer (born 1932)
 February 18 - Zvezdan Čebinac, Serbian footballer (born 1939)
 February 22 - Thabang Lebese, South African footballer (born 1973)
 February 23 - Peter King, English footballer (born 1964)
 February 26 - Árpád Fekete, Hungarian footballer (born 1921)
 February 27 - Armand Penverne, French footballer (born 1926)
 February 28 - Jaime Graça, Portuguese footballer (born 1942)
 February 29 - Karl Kodat, Austrian footballer (born 1943)

March

 March 1 - Henryk Bałuszyński, Polish footballer (born 1972)
 March 1 - Altamir Heitor Martins, Brazilian footballer (born 1980)
 March 2 - Gerry Bridgwood, English footballer (born 1944)
 March 6 - Marcos Alonso Imaz, Spanish footballer (born 1933)
 March 7 - Marcel Mouchel, French footballer (born 1927)
 March 7 - Włodzimierz Smolarek, Polish footballer (born 1957)
 March 7 - Ramaz Urushadze, Georgian footballer (born 1939)
 March 8 - Jens Petersen, Danish footballer (born 1941)
 March 9 - Brian Bromley, English footballer (born 1946)
 March 12 - Timo Konietzka, German footballer (first Bundesliga goal) (born 1938)
 March 13 - Amusa Shittu, Nigerian footballer (born 1937)
 March 14 - Ray Barlow, English footballer (born 1926)
 March 16 - Estanislau Basora, Spanish footballer (born 1926)
 March 19 - Karl-Heinz Spickenagel, German footballer (born 1932)
 March 23 - Péter Pázmándy, Hungarian footballer (born 1938)
 March 28 - Brian Philips, English footballer (born 1931)
 March 30 - Kees Guyt, Dutch footballer (born 1953)
 March 30 - Francesco Mancini, Italian footballer (born 1968)

April
 April 1 – Giorgio Chinaglia, Italian football player and manager (born 1947).
 April 3 - Airton Pavilhão, Brazilian footballer (born 1934)
 April 3 - José María Zárraga, Spanish footballer (born 1930)
 April 4 - Dubravko Pavličić, Croatian footballer (born 1967)
 April 5 - Jimmy Lawlor, Irish footballer (born 1933)
 April 6 - Larry Canning, English footballer (born 1925)
 April 6 - Dermot Hannafin (Snr), Gaelic footballer
 April 8 - John Egan, Gaelic footballer (born 1952)
 April 10 - Erdoğan Arıca, Turkish footballer (born 1954)
 April 12 - Kellon Baptiste, Grenadian footballer (born 1973)
 April 12 - Manfred Orzessek, German footballer (born 1933)
 April 14 - Lee Kyung-hwan, South Korean footballer (born 1988)
 April 14 - Eddie May, English footballer (born 1943)
 April 14 – Piermario Morosini, Italian football player (born 1986).
 April 15 - Samir Said, Kuwaiti footballer (born 1963)
 April 18 - Arthur Bottom, English footballer (born 1930)
 April 20 - Alfie Biggs, English footballer (born 1936)
 April 21 - Brian Heward, English footballer (born 1935)
 April 28 - Dudley Peake, Welsh footballer (born 1934)
 April 30 - Giannis Gravanis, Greek footballer (born 1958)

June
 June 21 – Ramaz Shengelia, Soviet Georgian player, played in the 1982 FIFA World Cup (born 1957).

July

 July 19 – Hans Nowak, German footballer (born 1937).
 July 31 – Alfredo Ramos, Brazilian defender, squad member of Brazil at the 1954 FIFA World Cup. (87)

August

 August 1 - Aldo Maldera, Italian footballer (58)
 August 2 - Bernd Meier, German footballer (40)
 August 6 - Boris Razinsky, Russian footballer (79)
 August 6 - Godfried van den Boer, Belgian footballer (78)
 August 8 - Surya Lesmana, Indonesian footballer (68)
 August 9 - Erol Togay, Turkish footballer (62)
 August 12 - Jackie Watters, Scottish footballer
 August 15 - Elson Iazegi Beyruth, Brazilian footballer (70)
 August 17 - Panos Markovic, Greek footballer (87)
 August 20 - Len Quested, English footballer (87)
 August 22 - Houcine Anafal, Moroccan footballer (59)
 August 24 - Krum Yanev, Bulgarian footballer (83)
 August 24 – Félix Miélli Venerando, Brazilian goalkeeper, winner of the 1970 FIFA World Cup. (74)
 August 25 - Florencio Amarilla, Paraguayan footballer (77)
 August 25 - Emilio Pacione, Scottish footballer
 August 26 - Alan Steen, English footballer (90)
 August 27 - Antoine Redin, French footballer (77)
 August 27 - Ivica Horvat, Croatian footballer (86)

September

 September 4 - Milan Vukelić, Serbian footballer (born 1936)
 September 5 - Ediz Bahtiyaroğlu, Turkish footballer (born 1986)
 September 6 - Oscar Rossi, Argentine footballer (born 1930)
 September 7 - Abdul Ghafoor, Pakistani footballer (born 1938)
 September 8 - Adolf Bechtold, German footballer (born 1926)
 September 9 - Ron Tindall, English footballer (born 1935)
 September 11 - Rolf Bjørn Backe, Norwegian footballer (born 1934)
 September 11 - Sergio Livingstone, Chilean footballer (born 1920)
 September 12 - Jimmy Andrews, Scottish footballer (born 1927)
 September 14 - Frank Dudley, English footballer (born 1925)
 September 15 - Predrag Brzaković, Serbian footballer (born 1964)
 September 15 - Jean-Louis Heinrich, French footballer (born 1943)
 September 17 - Bafo Biyela, South African footballer (born 1981)
 September 18 - Jorge Manicera, Uruguayan footballer (born 1938)
 September 18 - Olinto Sampaio Rubini, Mexican footballer (born 1934)
 September 19 - Rino Ferrario, Italian footballer (born 1926)
 September 20 - Michel Pech, French footballer (born 1946)
 September 21 - Len Weare, Welsh footballer (born 1934)
 September 25 - John Bond, English footballer (born 1932)
 September 26 - Pape Alioune Diop, Senegalese footballer
 September 28 - Juan Baena, Spanish footballer (born 1950)

October

 October 1 - Abdelkader Fréha, Algerian international footballer (born 1942)
 October 3 - Jean-Louis Lagadec, French footballer (born 1933)
 October 3 - Albie Roles, English footballer (born 1921)
 October 4 - Rudolf Oslansky, Austrian footballer (born 1931)
 October 7 - Georges Casolari, French footballer (born 1941)
 October 8 - Rafael Lesmes, Spanish footballer (born 1926)
 October 11 – Helmut Haller, German international footballer (born 1939).
 October 12 - Henry Moyo, Malawian footballer (born 1946)
 October 13 - Jim Rollo, Scottish footballer (born 1937)
 October 15 - Vladimir Čonč, Croatian footballer (born 1928)
 October 15 - Trevor Kemp, Scottish footballer 
 October 15 - Alberto Reif, Italian footballer (born 1946)
 October 17 - Milija Aleksic, English footballer (born 1951)
 October 17 - Bandya Kakade, Indian footballer
 October 17 - Pépito Pavon, Serbian footballer (born 1941)
 October 19 - Raúl Valencia, Spanish footballer (born 1976)
 October 19 - Jaouad Akaddar, Moroccan footballer (born 1984)
 October 23 - Philippe Di Santo, Belgian footballer (born 1950)
 October 23 - Hughie Hay, Scottish footballer
 October 23 - Jozef Mannaerts, Belgian footballer (born 1923)
 October 24 - Peter Wright, English footballer (born 1934)
 October 25 - John Connely, English footballer (born 1938)
 October 30 - Georges Van Straelen, French footballer (born 1956)

November

 November 1 - Jan Louwers, Dutch footballer (82)
 November 4 - Reg Pickett, English footballer (85)
 November 5 - Keih Ripley, English footballer (77)
 November 5 - Jimmy Stephen, Scottish footballer (90)
 November 6 - Ivor Powell, Welsh footballer (96)
 November 6 - Bohdan Tsap, Ukrainian footballer (71)
 November 7 - Heinz-Jürgen Blome, German footballer (65)
 November 8 - Bobby Gilfillan, Scottish footballer (74)
 November 10 - Eric Day, English footballer (91)
 November 12 - Arthur Bialas, German footballer (81)
 November 12 - Harry McShane, Scottish footballer (92)
 November 14 - Alexandro Alves do Nascimento, Brazilian footballer (37)
 November 14 - Paddy Meegan, Irish Gaelic footballer (90)
 November 15 - Théophile Abega, Cameroonian footballer (58)
 November 17 - Henryk Grzybowski, Polish footballer (78)
 November 18 - Kenny Morgans, Welsh footballer (73)
 November 20 – Mike Ryan, Irish-born American coach, first head coach of the United States women's national team. (77)
 November 20 - Gary Ingham, English footballer (48)
 November 21 - Wang Houjun, Chinese footballer (69)
 November 22 - Mario Murillo, Costa Rican footballer (85)
 November 22 - Raimund Krauth, German footballer (59)
 November 23 - Alfonso Montemayor, Mexican footballer defender (90)
 November 23 - Goffredo Stabellini, Italian footballer (87)
 November 25 - Bert Linnecor, English footballer (78)
 November 25 - Dave Sexton, English football manager (82)
 November 27 - Herbert Oberhofer, Austrian footballer (57)
 November 27 - Pascal Kalemba, Congolese footballer (33)
 November 27 - Lennart Samuelsson, Swedish footballer (88)
 November 28 - Cosimo Nocera, Italian footballer (74)
 November 28 – José Maria Fidélis dos Santos, Brazilian defender, squad member of Brazil at the 1966 FIFA World Cup. (68)
 November 30 - Mario Ardizzon, Italian footballer (74)

December

 December 1: Mitchell Cole, English footballer (born 1985).
 December 1: Steve Fox, English footballer (born 1958).
 December 1: Phil Taylor, English footballer (born 1917).
 December 2: Azumir Veríssimo, Brazilian footballer (born 1935).
 December 3: Tommy Berggren, Swedish footballer (born 1950).
 December 3: Diego Mendieta, Paraguayan footballer (born 1980).
 December 4: Miguel Calero, Colombian goalkeeper (born 1971).
 December 5: Doug Smith, Scottish footballer (born 1937).
 December 7: Denis Houf, Belgian footballer (born 1932).
 December 13: Ian Black, Scottish footballer (born 1924).
 December 13: T. Shanmugham, Indian footballer (born 1920).
 December 16: Adam Ndlovu, Zimbabwean footballer (born 1970).
 December 16: Jim Patterson, Scottish footballer.
 December 17: Charlie Adam, Scottish footballer (born 1962).
 December 18: George Showell, English footballer (born 1934).
 December 20: Stan Charlton, English footballer (born 1929).
 December 20: Dennis Stevens, English footballer (born 1933).
 December 21: George Hazlett, Scottish footballer (born 1923)
 December 22: Wattie Dick, Scottish footballer (born 1927).
 December 23: Cristian Tudor, Romanian footballer (born 1982).
 December 27: Ken Jones, English footballer (born 1944).
 December 28: Václav Drobný, Czech footballer (born 1980).
 December 29: Salvador Reyes, Mexican forward (born 1936).

References

 
Association football by year